Cease Fires is a compilation album by punk rock band Anti-Flag.  It contains twelve songs previously released on their 20 Years of Hell EPs and two previously unreleased outtakes from their latest studio album American Spring.

Anti-Flag originally didn't plan to re-release the twelve songs from their 20 Years of Hell EP series. But in the end they changed their mind, because of the importance of the songs and the exclusiveness of the EPs, hoping they wouldn't anger the EP buyers.

Track listing

References

2015 albums
A-F Records albums
Anti-Flag albums